Nick Lloyd FRHS, is Reader in Military and Imperial History at King's College London. He has written several books on the First World War.

Selected publications
Loos 1915. Stroud: Tempus, 2006.
The Amritsar Massacre: The Untold Story of One Fateful Day. London: I. B. Tauris, 2011
Hundred Days: The End of the Great War. London: Viking Press, 2013. 
Passchendaele: A New History. London: Viking Press, 2017.

References 

Living people
Academics of King's College London
Historians of World War I
Fellows of the Royal Historical Society
Year of birth missing (living people)